The 1950 Kategoria e Dytë is the seventh season of the second tier of football in Albania. The season started on 30 April and finished on 30 June, and 32 teams competed in a Single-elimination tournament with four teams qualifying for the final group, where Berati won the competition for the second time and NBSh Shijak finished as runners up.

First round

|}

Second round

|}

Third round

|}

Final round

Berati, NBSh Shijak, Erseka and NBSh Ylli Kuq Kamëz competed in the final group to determine the winner of the 1950 Kategoria e Dytë. The matches were played in Berat between 25–30 June 1950 and Berati came out winners with after winning all three games in the final group, with NBSh Shija finishing as runners up.

Notes

References

Kategoria e Parë seasons
Albania
2